In physics, the Yang–Baxter equation (or star–triangle relation) is a consistency equation which was first introduced in the field of statistical mechanics. It depends on the idea that in some scattering situations, particles may preserve their momentum while changing their quantum internal states. It states that a matrix , acting on two out of three objects, satisfies

In one dimensional quantum systems,  is the scattering matrix and if it satisfies the Yang–Baxter equation then the system is integrable.  The Yang–Baxter equation also shows up when discussing knot theory and the braid groups where  corresponds to swapping two strands.  Since one can swap three strands two different ways, the Yang–Baxter equation enforces that both paths are the same.

It takes its name from independent work of C. N. Yang from 1968, and R. J. Baxter from 1971.

General form of the parameter-dependent Yang–Baxter equation
Let  be a unital associative algebra.

The general form of the Yang–Baxter equation is

Parameter-independent form 

Let  be a unital associative algebra. The Yang–Baxter equation is

With respect to a basis 

Often the unital associative algebra is the algebra of endomorphisms of a vector space  over a field , that is,  . Omitting parameter dependence, the component of the Yang–Baxter equation associated to the map  reads

Alternate form and representations of the braid group

Let  be the linear map satisfying  for all .

.

Alternatively, we can express it in the same notation as above, defining  , in which case the alternate form is

In the parameter-independent special case where  does not depend on parameters, the equation reduces to

,

This representation can be used to determine quasi-invariants of braids, knots and links.

Symmetry

Solutions to the Yang–Baxter equation are often constrained by requiring the  matrix to be invariant under the action of a Lie group . The general form of the -matrix is then  for scalar functions .

The Yang–Baxter equation is homogeneous in parameter dependence in the sense that if one defines , where  is a scalar function, then  also satisfies the Yang–Baxter equation.

The argument space itself may have symmetry. For example translation invariance enforces that the dependence on the arguments  must be dependence only on the translation-invariant difference , while scale invariance enforces that  is a function of the scale-invariant ratio .

Parametrizations and example solutions

A common ansatz for computing solutions is the difference property, where R depends only on a single (additive) parameter. Equivalently, taking logarithms, we may choose the parametrization  , in which case R is said to depend on a multiplicative parameter. In those cases, we may reduce the YBE to two free parameters in a form that facilitates computations:

For a multiplicative parameter, the Yang–Baxter equation is

The braided forms read as:

In some cases, the determinant of  can vanish at specific values of the spectral parameter . Some  matrices turn into a one dimensional projector at 
. In this case a quantum determinant can be defined .

Example solutions of the parameter-dependent YBE 

 A particularly simple class of parameter-dependent solutions can be obtained from solutions of the parameter-independent YBE satisfying , where the corresponding braid group representation is a permutation group representation. In this case,  (equivalently) is a solution of the (additive) parameter-dependent YBE.

 The -matrices of the evaluation modules of the quantum group  are given explicitly by the matrix

Then the parametrized Yang-Baxter equation with the multiplicative parameter is satisfied:

Classification of solutions 

There are broadly speaking three classes of solutions: rational, trigonometric and elliptic. These are related to quantum groups known as the Yangian, affine quantum groups and elliptic algebras respectively.

Set-theoretic Yang–Baxter equation 
Set-theoretic solutions were studied by Drinfeld. This then induces a map  given by restriction of the -matrix to the basis. The set-theoretic Yang–Baxter equation is then defined using the 'twisted' alternate form above, asserting

The equation can then be considered purely as an equation in the category of sets.

Examples 
 .
  where , the transposition map.
 If  is a (right) shelf, then  is a set-theoretic solution to the YBE.

Classical Yang–Baxter equation 
Solutions to the classical YBE were studied and to some extent classified by Belavin and Drinfeld. Given a 'classical -matrix' , which may also depend on a pair of arguments , the classical YBE is (suppressing parameters)

This equation emerges from so called quasi-classical solutions to the quantum YBE, in which the -matrix admits an asymptotic expansion in terms of an expansion parameter 

The classical YBE then comes from reading off the  coefficient of the quantum YBE (and the equation trivially holds at orders ).

See also

 Lie bialgebra
 Yangian
 Reidemeister move
 Quasitriangular Hopf algebra

References
 
 H.-D. Doebner, J.-D. Hennig, eds, Quantum groups, Proceedings of the 8th International Workshop on Mathematical Physics, Arnold Sommerfeld Institute, Clausthal, FRG, 1989, Springer-Verlag Berlin, .
 Vyjayanthi Chari and Andrew Pressley, A Guide to Quantum Groups, (1994), Cambridge University Press, Cambridge .
 Jacques H.H. Perk and Helen Au-Yang, "Yang–Baxter Equations", (2006), .

External links
 

Monoidal categories
Statistical mechanics
Equations of physics
Exactly solvable models
Conformal field theory